Skå IK is a Swedish football club located in Skå in Ekerö Municipality.

Background
Skå IK currently plays in Division 4 Stockholm Mellersta which is the sixth tier of Swedish football. They play their home matches at the Svanängens IP in Skå.

The club is affiliated to Stockholms Fotbollförbund.

Season to season

Footnotes

External links
 Skå IK – Official website

Football clubs in Stockholm
1934 establishments in Sweden